Pieter Myburgh (born 10 January 1986) is a Namibian rugby union footballer.

External links 
Stormers profile
WP rugby profile
sarugby.com profile

1986 births
Living people
Free State Cheetahs players
Namibian rugby union players
Rugby union flankers
Rugby union players from Windhoek
Stormers players
Western Province (rugby union) players